Salt Fat Acid Heat: Mastering the Elements of Good Cooking is a 2017 cookbook written by American chef Samin Nosrat and illustrated by Wendy MacNaughton. The book was designed by Alvaro Villanueva. It inspired the 2018 American four-part cooking docu-series Salt Fat Acid Heat.

Contents 
A reference book, the cookbook is focused on teaching techniques and structured around the four titular elements: Salt, Fat, Acid, and Heat. The book explains what they are and how to master them in your cooking in order to become a better, more intuitive cook. Nosrat explains that these are the defining factors which determine the flavor and texture of food every time you cook, calling them the "cardinal directions" of cooking. The goal of the book is for readers to leave with a new cooking philosophy.

Split into two halves, the first focuses on understanding each of the four pillars in-depth and the second has recipes to put it all into practice. There are 100 recipes with dozens of variations, intended to act as a foundation for improvisation in the kitchen. 

The whole book has MacNaughton's watercolor illustrations, infographics and hand-lettering throughout and no photographs.  Saveur described it as a "refreshing break from this contemporary formula" of "cleanly laid-out recipe facing an artful image of salad or toast". Nosrat insisted on illustrations so that readers wouldn't feel like there was one singular way to cook the recipes and would instead use them as a jumping off point. Nosrat described this intention:I knew from the beginning this book couldn’t be photographed because it was about concepts, and about teaching people looseness in the kitchen. Photos are so precise and representational. I wanted to give you a way to use whatever you had on hand and not feel tied to a recipe.Nosrat reached out to MacNaughton early on and the two had a close collaboration.

History 
Nosrat started working on the book around 2009/2010 when Michael Pollan, an author and cooking student of hers, learned about her four-part system and encouraged her to write a book about it. She developed a curriculum based on the concept and taught many classes on it to develop the material. Throughout the process, Nosrat would note which concepts were easier to convey visually and started to design diagrams to help explain them. These also formed the foundation of diagrams in the book which give an overview, for example of sources of acid or salt.

Overall, Nosrat worked on the book for 7 years. The content was developed overtime through her teaching, then the proposal took four years to prepare: three to write it, then Nosrat worked for another year with MacNaughton on the illustrations. She wanted the proposal to be illustrated because the approach was different enough from the standard cookbook that she felt it was needed to convince publishers. The finished proposal went to auction, was sold in 2013 and then published four years later in 2017.

Reception 
The publishing of the book was met with positive reviews from many established publications, including Saveur, The Atlantic, and Food52. It was named "Food Book of the Year" by The Times of London and was a New York Times best seller.  

Even after its publication in 2017, the book remained on best-seller list for years. In 2019, it was named one of the ten "Best Cookbooks of the Century So Far" by Helen Rosner in The New Yorker.  Rosner described the book as helpful for cooks of all skill levels, seeing it "as a guide for beginners in need of essential egg-scrambling techniques or for experienced cooks looking to burnish their confidence and bolster their skills." Rosner said that is the rare reference book which is meant to be read straight-through and which "flat-out teach[es] you, from the ground up, how to be a good cook."

Awards 
The cookbook won the 2018 James Beard Award for Best General Cookbook, and was named Cookbook of the Year by the International Association of Culinary Professionals.

References 

2017 non-fiction books
American cookbooks
Simon & Schuster books